Hermitage of Sant'Angelo may refer to:
Hermitage of Sant'Angelo in Lettomanoppello
Hermitage of Sant'Angelo in Palombaro